Banksia splendida subsp. macrocarpa is a subspecies of Banksia splendida. It was known as Dryandra speciosa subsp. macrocarpa until 2007, when Austin Mast and Kevin Thiele sunk all Dryandra into Banksia. Since there was already a species named Banksia speciosa, Mast and Thiele had to choose a new specific epithet for D. speciosa and hence for this subspecies of it. As with other members of Banksia ser. Dryandra, it is endemic to the South West Botanical Province of Western Australia.

References

Further reading
 
 
 
 

splendida subsp. macrocarpa
Plant subspecies